The year 1831 CE in archaeology included many events, some of which are listed below.

Explorations 
 Juan Galindo explores the Maya ruins of Palenque.
 Charles Nebel makes first survey of El Tajín.

Finds
 Spring: The Lewis chessmen are found in a sand-bank on the Isle of Lewis
 24 October: The Alexander Mosaic is found in the House of the Faun, Pompeii

Births
7 June: Amelia Edwards, English Egyptologist and fiction writer (died 1892)

Deaths

References

Archaeology
Archaeology by year
Archaeology
Archaeology